Giulio Scandella (born September 18, 1983) is a Canadian-born Italian professional ice hockey player. He is currently a free agent having last played for the Les Pétroliers du Nord of the Ligue Nord-Américaine de Hockey (LNAH).

International
Scandella participated at the 2010 IIHF World Championship as a member of the Italian National men's ice hockey team.

He was named to the Italy national ice hockey team for competition at the 2014 IIHF World Championship.

Personal life
Scandella is the older brother of current St. Louis Blues defenceman Marco Scandella. He is also the nephew of former NHL player Sergio Momesso. Scandella's father, Francesco, is an Italian immigrant.

Career statistics

Regular season and playoffs

International

References

External links

1983 births
Living people
HC Ajoie players
Augsburger Panther players
Asiago Hockey 1935 players
Bolzano HC players
Canadian people of Italian descent
Halifax Mooseheads players
Ice hockey players at the 2006 Winter Olympics
Italian ice hockey left wingers
Olympic ice hockey players of Italy
IK Oskarshamn players
HC Pustertal Wölfe players
Ritten Sport players
Rouyn-Noranda Huskies players
Ice hockey people from Montreal